Wickham Festival is a four-day music event that takes place in the village of Wickham, Hampshire, England. Wickham hosts live music and comedy across four stages, as well as food stalls, craft stalls, real ale and cider bars and children's entertainers. It has been listed by The Guardian as a top 'Family Friendly Boutique Festival'. The 2015 Wickham Festival was named Best Festival (under 15,000 capacity) at the Live UK Music Business Awards, and the 2018 event won Best Festival at The Guide Awards, with the 2019 event taking the title of Best Live Event.
 
Although the history of the festival can be traced to the 2003 Eastleigh Festival, the first Wickham Festival was held from 3–6 August 2006 in and around the village community centre, with a line-up rooted in folk and traditional music. Since then the festival has expanded (moving to its current site in 2013) to become a venue for both well established artists and those just breaking through, across many musical genres, and has previously hosted talks from Tony Benn and Bill Oddie. Recent years have seen high profile performances from rock and pop artists, including Van Morrison, James Blunt, Kiefer Sutherland, Frank Turner, Wilko Johnson and Lightning Seeds. The festival has not lost touch with its roots, continuing to promote folk music, world music and such festival stalwarts as Richard Thompson, Bellowhead and Steve Earle. Wickham Festival has also introduced British audiences to international musicians, including Carlos Núñez Muñoz, The Spooky Men's Chorale and Le Vent du Nord.

History
The origins of Wickham Festival can be found in the original Gosport Festival of the early 1990s, and the Eastleigh Music Festival. Both these events were organised by local councillor and music promoter Peter Chegwyn.

Gosport Festival
The original Gosport Festival organised by Chegwyn, Robin Fegan & Pam Pullen ran from 1991 to 1995 on Walpole Park, Gosport, Hampshire. Concerts were held in a 1000 capacity 'Big Top' and an Open Stage. Artists to perform at the festival included Roger Taylor of Queen, B B King, The Saw Doctors, The Manfreds and The Bootleg Beatles. The Gosport Festival also saw one of the first shows from the supergroup SAS Band.

Gosport and Fareham Easter Festival
Mr Chegwyn also organised the popular Gosport & Fareham Easter Folk Festival, which ran from 2001 to 2011, Based out of Fernham Hall, Fareham (the festival also utilised the Ashcroft Arts Centre and Wallington Village Hall), attendees would be treated to four days of folk music, workshops,  dance displays, craft fairs, and a Cèilidh.

The festival was set to move to Wickham in 2012, however it was decided to incorporate it into Wickham Festival instead.

Eastleigh 'Big Top' Music Festival
The current festival began as the Eastleigh 'Big Top' Music festival in 2003:

The history of Eastleigh’s Music Festival can be traced back to 2002 with the involvement of Keith House, Eastleigh’s council leader with his fellow Liberal Democrat and county council colleague Peter Chegwyn who was also a music promoter. Mr Chegwyn had been organising a highly successful music festival in Gosport which had featured artistes like the international blues superstar and guitar legend B.B King. The intention was to try and replicate the success in Eastleigh.

Location(s)

Previous locations
Since the first Eastleigh Music Festival in 2003, the site changed a number of times before settling in its current location.

Eastleigh
Between 2003 and 2005, the festival took place at Eastleigh Park, Eastleigh. The Eastleigh Music Festival was a six day event featuring live music and entertainment, with free lunchtime world music concerts, free family entertainment every afternoon and ticketed evening concerts.

Stokes Bay
The festival moved to Wickham in 2006, however due to issues with  Winchester Council, it was relocated for 2008 and 2009. For these two years, Wickham was incorporated in to the Stokes Bay Festival at Stokes Bay, Gosport. The festival returned to Wickham in 2010.

Wickham

Wickham is a village located in Hampshire, just north of Fareham. The historic village square is home to a number of bars, restaurants, boutique shops and hotels. Wickham is also home to the historic Chesapeake Mill, built from the timbers of HMS Chesapeake.

Apart from 2008/2009, the festival has taken place in Wickham since 2006. The first Wickham Festival included performances from Daby Blade from Senegal, Spiers and Boden, Los Pacaminos, Richard Thompson, Shooglenifty, Sparks, Oysterband, Fiddlers' Bid, Osibisa, Flook, Steeleye Span and The Larry Love Showband. These shows primarily took place in and around the Village community centre.

In the years since 2006, the festival site has moved slightly to the fields either side of Blind Lane, north of the village square. The festival settled on its current site in 2013, where it has expanded to include three music stages, a dance stage, food and craft fayres and real ale and cider bars. The festival also features family entertainment, including a Digital Funfair and the Groovy Movie Solar Powered Picture House. Camping facilities have also grown to include  glamping fields and spaces for motorhomes.

Present day

2010s
The 2014 festival started with one of Wickham's biggest audiences, when 7,000 people saw James Blunt perform in the Big Top. Other acts to appear that year included Lightning Seeds, Bellowhead, The Ukulele Orchestra of Great Britain and Hugh Cornwell. The festival was also treated to a rare UK appearance from Steve Earle & the Dukes.

2014 also saw the introduction of the Acoustic Stage, and the first editions of the Wickham Festival podcast.

The 2015 festival saw the introduction of an open mic stage and a late night Festival Club, a new viewing platform for the use of disabled festival-goers, and other improved facilities.

Artists appearing at the festival included: Billy Bragg, Seth Lakeman, Eliza Carthy Big Band, 10cc, The Proclaimers, Moulettes, Show of Hands, Martin Carthy, Wilko Johnson, Andy Fairweather-Low, Tom Robinson, De Temps Antan, The Spooky Men's Chorale, Askew Sisters, The South, Lisbee Stainton, Luka Bloom, Tankus the Henge, Les Barker and Roy Bailey.

Wickham Festival 2015 was awarded the 'Best Festival (Cap. under 15,000)' at the 2015 Live Music Awards, and was shortlisted for 'Best Event' at the Portsmouth WOW247 Awards.

The number of stages at the Festival increased for 2016. The site included three covered stages and one open air stage, as well as a performance stage for dancers. All Time Grates sponsored the main stage at the festival, with Sam FM and The Breeze joining the festival to support the second stage.

In 2017 the camping capacity was increased with three added fields, and a free concert at Wickham Community Centre was scheduled to entertain early arrivals on the Wednesday evening. 

After its successful launch at the 2017 festival, it was announced that Jonathan Pie would be returning in 2018 to headline the comedy stage. The festival ultimately included five fully programmed stages of music, as well as the late night comedy and the return of a free concert in the Wickham Centre.

Wickham Festival 2018 won the 'Best Festival' award at The News Guide Awards 2019.

2019
Following the conclusion of the 2018 festival, early bird tickets were made available for 2019. The dates for the festival are 1–4 August 2019. A strong line up was put together, featuring Graham Nash, local boy Frank Turner, Hollywood star Kiefer Sutherland and Barnsley comedy-folk stalwarts The Bar-Steward Sons of Val Doonican. The second stage (Village Stage) has been expanded to give it equal billing with the bigtop (Valley Stage).

The 2019 Wickham Festival won the award for 'Outstanding Street Food at a Music Festival' at the Hampshire Street Food Awards.

2020/21
The dates for the 2020 Wickham Festival have been announce as the 6-9 of August. In September 2019 it was announced The Young'uns will be playing Wickham Festival 2020. Stanley Jordan will be returning to the festival, playing a set of Jimi Hendrix music inspired by his iconic Isle of Wight Festival appearance. Van Morrison was announced as the Saturday night headliner.

On 1 July 2020 it was announced that due to the ongoing [COVID-19_pandemic] Wickham Festival 2020 was being postponed. 

Within the announcement it was revealed that the festival would return in 2021, with all 2020 tickets still valid and all booked artists returning.

Following the postponement, a special 'drive-in' concert was arranged with Show Of Hands.

The 2021 festival took place on 5–8 August, with a majority of artists that were booked to appear at the postponed 2020 festival agreeing to appear in 2021. Deacon Blue, Fairport Convention and Moya Brennan among those acts added to the line-up.

2022
At the conclusion of the 2021 event, the dates for Wickham Festival 2022 were announced as being 4 August to 7 August. Having had to withdraw from the previous festival Waterboys were the first act confirmed for 2022. Saw Doctors will headline in a UK festival exclusive, with Martha Wainwright, Rumer, 10cc and Gilbert O'Sullivan among the many other confirmed acts.

Lineups

This table shows the 'Main Stage' headliners and other notable performers from the all stages at Wickham Festival.

Charity
Wickham Festival works closely with Two Saints, a Fareham-based charity that supports homeless and vulnerable young people across south Hampshire. Over £4,000 was raised for them over the 2014 festival weekend, with this figure being topped in 2015, with a total of £5,000 being raised. A similar amount continued to be raised at every festival since.

For the 2016 festival, a partnership with The League Against Cruel Sports was announced. The League was established in 1924 and campaigns to end cruelty to animals in sport. The charity hosted a sanctuary tent at the Festival, where attendees could learn more about their campaigns and 'enjoy some tranquillity'.

In 2021 a guitar signed by artists appearing at the festival was raffled, to raise money for the music therapy charity George's Rockstars. The raffle raised over £1,300 for the charity.

References

External links
Wickham Festival Official Website
Wickham Festival Interviews
Wickham Festival Podcast on iTunes

Music festivals in Hampshire
Folk festivals in the United Kingdom
Rock festivals in the United Kingdom
English folk music